Dhani Kumharan is an Indian  village located in the Taranagar tehsil of Churu district, Rajasthan. In 2001, the population was 2,297 people with 1,142 males and 1,155 females .

See also
 List of villages in Churu district

References

 

Villages in Churu district